Ein or EIN may refer to:

Science and technology 
 Ein function, in mathematics
 Endometrial intraepithelial neoplasia, a lesion of the uterine lining
 Equivalent input noise, of a microphone
 European Informatics Network, a 1970s computer network

Fictional characters
 Ein, a character in the anime series Cowboy Bebop
 Ein, a character in the video game series Dead or Alive
 Ein, the protagonist of the Game Boy Advance game Riviera: The Promised Land

Other uses 
 Aer Lingus (ICAO code), the flag carrier airline of Ireland
 Eindhoven Airport (IATA code), in the Netherlands
 Employer Identification Number, assigned by the US Internal Revenue Service
 EPODE International Network, a Belgian obesity organization